José Rómulo Villalobos Campos (born 4 March 1997) is a Salvadoran footballer who plays as a defender for Primera División club Dragón and the El Salvador national team.

International career
Villalobos debuted with the El Salvador national team in a 0–0 friendly draw against Guatemala on 27 June 2021. Villalobos was called up to represent El Salvador at the 2021 CONCACAF Gold Cup, but had to withdraw as he suffered a fractured hand.

References

External links
 
 

1997 births
Living people
People from San Miguel, El Salvador
Salvadoran footballers
El Salvador international footballers
El Salvador youth international footballers
Association football defenders
C.D. Águila footballers
Salvadoran Primera División players